Ken Hoole (1916–1988) was an English historian known for his works on the railways of the north east of England.

The Ken Hoole Study Centre at the Darlington Railway Centre and Museum, and the Ken Hoole Trust are named after him.

Biography
Ken Hoole was born in Doncaster in 1916. A railway interest was kindled by daily journeys by train to school in Kingston upon Hull from his home in Bridlington, Yorkshire. He served in radio security during the Second World War. In civilian life his interest led to him becoming a full-time writer on railway history, eventually authoring over 40 books.

He was a founder of the North Eastern Railway Association (NERA), and of the Scarborough Railway Society. Latterly, Hoole lived at Scarborough, North Yorkshire. He died on 27 December 1988.

Works and legacy
Ken Hoole published over forty books as well as numerous magazine articles.

The study centre, The Ken Hoole Study Centre, opened 1992, at the Darlington Railway Centre and Museum (now Head of Steam museum) in Darlington, inheriting its core collection from a bequeathal from Ken Hoole's archive, as well as including the library of the NERA. The Ken Hoole trust, established in his memory, helps fund projects relating to railway history and heritage.

Published works
In addition to his own works, he also wrote forewords for, corrected and updated reprints of several historic works including William Weaver Tomlinson's North Eastern Railway, G.G. MacTurk's A history of the Hull railways, and George David Parker's The Hull and Barnsley Railway. He also edited the first volume of the two volume The Hull and Barnsley Railway (1972).

, 2nd edition 1974, 3rd edition 1986

, 3 editions, 2nd 1968, 3rd 1973

As co-author

See also
Willie Yeadon, railway historian known for accounts of LNER locomotives

References

People from Doncaster
1916 births
1988 deaths
Rail transport writers
20th-century English historians